The Centralia Downtown Historic District is a  historic district in Centralia, Washington, which was listed on the National Register of Historic Places in 2003. It is roughly bounded by Center St., Burlington Northern right-of-way, Walnut St., and Pearl St. It includes 59 contributing buildings, a contributing structure, and three contributing objects.

Four sites in the district are already listed separately on the National Register:
Centralia Union Depot (210 Railroad Avenue), 
Centralia Main Post Office (214 W. Locust),
Olympic Club Saloon (112 N. Tower) 
The Sentinel, a sculpture dedicated to four legionnaires killed in Centralia's 1919 Armistice Day Riot.

The district includes a Masonic lodge building, the Centralia Masonic Lodge (1923) at 218 N. Pearl.

References

External links

Historic districts on the National Register of Historic Places in Washington (state)
National Register of Historic Places in Lewis County, Washington
Late 19th and Early 20th Century American Movements architecture